David Cameron formed the second Cameron ministry, the first Conservative majority government since 1996, following the 2015 general election after being invited by Queen Elizabeth II to form a new administration. Prior to the election Cameron had led his first ministry, the Cameron–Clegg coalition, a coalition government that consisted of members of the Conservatives and the Liberal Democrats, with Liberal Democrat leader Nick Clegg as Deputy Prime Minister.

Following the vote to leave at the EU referendum on the morning of 24 June, Cameron said that he would resign as Prime Minister after a new Leader of the Conservative Party was chosen after the party conference in the autumn. It was announced on 11 July 2016 that he would resign on 13 July and be succeeded by Home Secretary, Theresa May.

History
Cameron announced his choice for Chancellor of the Exchequer, Home Secretary, Foreign Secretary and Defence Secretary on the afternoon of 8 May 2015, with George Osborne, Theresa May, Philip Hammond and Michael Fallon retaining their posts. Osborne was also given the honorific title of First Secretary of State, which had been held by William Hague in the preceding ministry.

Cameron's choices for other ministers were announced through the week. Eric Pickles, previously the Communities Secretary left the Cabinet and received a knighthood, being replaced by Greg Clark. Michael Gove moved to the position of Justice Secretary, replacing Chris Grayling, who became the new Leader of the House of Commons.

Several vacant Cabinet posts previously held by Liberal Democrats were subsequently filled by Conservative ministers – the positions of Business Secretary, Energy Secretary, Scottish Secretary and Chief Secretary to the Treasury were given to Sajid Javid, Amber Rudd, David Mundell and Greg Hands respectively, with John Whittingdale replacing Javid as Culture Secretary.

Mark Harper replaced Gove as Chief Whip, whilst Matthew Hancock became the new Minister for the Cabinet Office, being replaced by Anna Soubry as Minister of State for Small Business, Industry and Enterprise. Also Priti Patel became the new Minister of State for Employment and Robert Halfon became a Minister without Portfolio.

The Minister of State for Social Care portfolio was downgraded to a Parliamentary Under-Secretary of State in 2016 under this ministry. It would not regain its former stature until 24 January 2018, under the Second May ministry's 2018 British cabinet reshuffle.

Cabinet

Changes
On 19 March 2016, Iain Duncan Smith resigned from his post of Secretary of State for Work and Pensions over plans by Chancellor George Osborne to cut disability benefits. He was replaced by Welsh Secretary Stephen Crabb. Alun Cairns filled the vacancy left by Crabb's promotion. His post was filled by Guto Bebb.

List of ministers

Prime Minister and the Cabinet Office

Departments of State

Law Officers

Parliament

See also
Premiership of David Cameron

Notes

References

External links
Gov UK – UK Cabinet
BBC News – UK Cabinet

British ministries
Government
Ministry 2
2015 establishments in the United Kingdom
2010s in British politics
Ministries of Elizabeth II
Cabinets established in 2015
2016 disestablishments in the United Kingdom
Cabinets disestablished in 2016